Whatstandwell railway station is a railway station owned by Network Rail and managed by East Midlands Railway. It serves the villages of Whatstandwell and Crich Carr in Derbyshire, England. The station is located on the Derwent Valley Line from Derby to Matlock.

There is a ticketing machine on the single platform; a full range of tickets for travel for any destination in the country can be also purchased from the guard on the train at no extra cost.

History

It was opened by the Manchester, Buxton, Matlock and Midlands Junction Railway as 'Whatstandwell Bridge' on 4 June 1849, though it was not listed in the timetable until 1853. It was north of the  Whatstandwell Tunnel, behind the Derwent Hotel.

On 4 October 1853 a luggage train was on its way from Rowsley to Ambergate and at Whatstandwell was put into a siding to collect some empty wagons. It derailed and a breakdown crew was sent for from Derby. With this assistance, the train was re-railed and set off for Ambergate. The break down train which had come from Derby was standing on the wrong line for returning to Derby. Instead of continuing for 1/2 a mile to cross onto the correct line they determined to return to Derby on the wrong line, calculating that they would get back before anything started out from Derby. They ignored the rules of the company which required a fireman walking 800 yards in advance of the train and proceeding at a walking pace. Instead they travelled at full speed. They collided with another engine and Michael Barker, a fireman, was killed. Samuel Kent, George Cawood and John Smeeton were indicted for his manslaughter. They were found guilty at the Midland Assizes on 18 March 1854. Kent was sentenced by Lord Chief Justice Jervis to 18 months’ imprisonment and hard labour and the others got 12 months each.

The station was moved to its present location in 1894 when the name became 'Whatstandwell'. The platform at the original station still exists. The area was used as a goods yard after the present station was built. The contractor for the new station was W.C. Hardy of Derby. The new station opened on 11 November 1894.

A little way north was High Peak Junction at the base of the former rope-worked incline of the Cromford and High Peak Railway.

Stationmasters

Thomas Stevenson ca. 1853 ca. 1854
Robert Turner ca. 1857 - 1860
Luke Fox 1860 - 1864 (afterwards station master at Cudworth)
S. Greenhough from 1864  
William Webster ca. 1871 - 1873 (afterwards station master at Chapel-en-le-Frith)
Brierly Ayton 1873 (formerly station master at Beauchief, appointed to Whatstandwell but died 27 February 1873)
William T. Stowell 1873 - 1876 (formerly station master at Wixford, afterwards station master at Crosby Garrett)
Edwin Hoe 1876 - 1879 (afterwards station master at Finedon)
George Simmons 1879 - 1883
Fred Watkin 1883 - 1887 (formerly station master at Stirchley Street, afterwards station master at Shefford)
Charles Whitmore 1887 - 1896 (formerly station master at Ratby)
H.T. Swain 1896 - 1900 (formerly station master at Penns)
Harry Smith Dawes 1900 - 1911 (formerly station master at New Mills, afterwards station master at Bakewell) 
William Henry Hewitt 1911 - ca. 1937
E. Barker ca. 1946
A. Cyril Phillips until 1957

Today

The station is served by East Midlands Railway, who operate the service from Nottingham to Matlock (via Derby). For journeys beginning at Whatstandwell, tickets may be bought from the machine on the platform or on the train for any destination in the country; beyond Derby, tickets must be bought at the ticket office. The journey time to Derby is approximately 24 minutes. Services are approximately hourly, but two-hourly on Sundays. Trains on the Derwent Valley line were replaced by a bus service for several weeks in late summer of 2018; this was due to essential works being carried out on the approach to Derby station.

The footbridge at the station leads to the Cromford Canal towpath and to a bridge over the canal to Main Road and the village. 

A team of volunteers from the village helps to maintain the station and car park.

Services
All services at Whatstandwell are operated by East Midlands Railway.

Saturdays also have an hourly service but all the trains originate or end in Derby.

On Sundays, there is a two-hourly service between Matlock and Nottingham in the morning, with services increasing to hourly from mid-afternoon onwards.

References

External links

 "Picture the Past" Whatstandwell station 1900-10
Pictures from the Wirksworth archives
 Friends of the Derwent Valley Line
 Peak Rail
 Derwent Valley Line East Midlands Trains Community Rail Partnership

Railway stations in Derbyshire
DfT Category F2 stations
Former Midland Railway stations
Railway stations in Great Britain opened in 1849
Railway stations in Great Britain closed in 1894
Railway stations in Great Britain opened in 1894
Railway stations served by East Midlands Railway
1849 establishments in England